Christopher Malcolm Newton (born 29 September 1973, Middlesbrough, England) is a road and track racing cyclist. Newton is a multiple world champion and triple Olympic medalist.

Biography
Newton went to Linthorpe Juniors and Boynton Comprehensive in Teesside, and, aged 13, started cycling with Teesside Clarion. He is an alumnus of the University of Teesside in Middlesbrough. Newton first competed in the Commonwealth Games in 1994, winning the silver medal in the Team Pursuit with Tony Doyle, Rob Hayles and Bryan Steel.

He was a member of the British Team Pursuit squad which finished tenth at the 1996 Olympic Games in Atlanta. The team included Matt Illingworth, Rob Hayles and Bryan Steel. He won the bronze medal in the Team Pursuit at the 2000 Olympic Games in Sydney. He won a silver medal in the Team Pursuit, and the bronze in the Points Race at the 2002 Commonwealth Games in Manchester.

Newton won the silver medal in the Team Pursuit at the 2004 Olympic Games in Athens. He also competed in the Points Race, but failed to finish the race. He won gold in the Team Pursuit at the 2006 Commonwealth Games in Melbourne.

Despite his focus on pursuing a track career at world class level, Newton's all-round ability has also seen him take many wins in top international amateur road races throughout his career.

Newton broke his collarbone on 6 March 2008 when a car door was opened in his path whilst he was training on the road, putting him out of contention for the upcoming World Championships at the end of March. This put him on the backfoot at the 2008 Summer Olympics in Beijing, where he contested the points race. Joan Llaneras built up an impressive lead to take the gold, leaving Newton to battle it out with Roger Kluge for silver. A late attack by Kluge left Newton unable to respond, but he was happy to take a bronze medal at his fourth Olympic Games.

At the first round of the World Cup Classics series, in Manchester on 1 November 2008, Newton was on top form and dominated the points race. He was the clear winner and won the final sprint to a standing ovation from the crowd. On that night Great Britain won all gold in all 6 events.

Palmarès

Track

1991
4th Junior World Championships, Team Pursuit
1993
1st  National Track Champs, Scratch Race
1994
2nd Team Pursuit, Commonwealth Games (with Doyle, Hayles & Steel)
1995
1st  National Track Champs, Scratch Race
1st  National Track Champs, Team Pursuit
1996
3rd World Cup, Germany, Team Pursuit, (with Hayles, Illingworth & Steel)
3rd World Cup, Italy, Team Pursuit, (with Wallace, Illingworth & Steel)
1999
1st  National Track Champs, Team Pursuit
2000
2nd World Championships, Team Pursuit (with Wiggins, Manning & Steel)
3rd Team Pursuit, Olympic Games, (with Clay, Hayles, Manning, Steel & Wiggins)
2001
2nd World Championships, Team Pursuit (with Wiggins, Manning & Steel)
2nd World Cup, Poland, Team Pursuit, (with Wiggins, Manning, Steel & West)
2002
1st  World Championships, Points Race
1st  National Track Champs, Points Race
2nd World Championships, Team Pursuit (with Wiggins, Manning & Steel)
2nd Team Pursuit, Commonwealth Games, (with Manning, Steel & Wiggins)
3rd Points Race, Commonwealth Games
2003
1st  National Track Champs, Scratch Race
3rd World Cup, Mexico, Points Race
4th World Championships, Points Race
2004
2nd Team Pursuit, Olympic Games, (with Cummings, Manning & Steel)
2nd World Championships, Team Pursuit (with Hayles, Manning & Steel)
1st World Cup, Sydney, Team Pursuit, (with Hayles, Manning, Steel & R. Downing
1st World Cup, Manchester (with Hayles, Manning & Steel)
1st  National Track Champs, Points Race
1st  National Track Champs, Scratch Race
1st  National Track Champs, Team Pursuit (with Manning, White & Cavendish)
2nd World Cup, Sydney, Points Race
2nd World Cup, Los Angeles, Points Race
3rd World Cup, Moscow, Scratch Race 15km
4th World Cup, Mexico, Points Race
4th World Cup, Moscow, Points Race
2005
1st  World Championships, Team Pursuit (with Steve Cummings, Paul Manning and Rob Hayles)
1st World Cup, Manchester (1), (with Steve Cummings, Paul Manning and Rob Hayles)
2nd World Cup, Manchester (2), (with Mark Cavendish, Paul Manning and Rob Hayles)
2006
1st World Cup, Moscow, Team Pursuit, (with Manning, Thomas & Clancy)
1st Team Pursuit, Commonwealth Games, (with Cummings, Manning and Rob Hayles)
1st  National Track Champs, Scratch Race
1st  National Track Champs, Team Pursuit
3rd National Track Champs, Pursuit (with Manning, Cummings and Clancy)
4th World Championships, Points Race
2008
3rd Points race, 2008 Summer Olympics
1st World Cup, Points Race series winner
1st  National Track Champs, Scratch Race
1st  National Track Champs, Points Race
2009
1st Points race, 2008–09 UCI Track Cycling World Ranking
1st  National Track Champs, Scratch Race
1st  National Track Champs, Points Race

3rd Points Race World Championships Poland

Road

1993
1st British Centre of Excellence Road Race

1995
1st Premier Calendar, International Archer Grand Prix
1st Premier Calendar, Silver Spoon 2-day
1st Stage 2, Silver Spoon 2-day
2nd Stage 1, Silver Spoon 2-day
2nd Stage 3, Silver Spoon 2-day
2nd British National Championships, Team Time Trial
3rd British National Championships, Hill Climb

1996
1st Tour of Lancashire
1st Premier Calendar, International Archer Grand Prix
2nd Tour of Langkawi, Malaysia
1st King of the Mountains, Tour of Langkawi
3rd British National Time Trial Championships – 25-mile

1997
1st  British National Championships, Team Time Trial
1st British National Time Trial Championships – 25-mile
1st Grand Prix de l'Oms a Fontainne, France
1st Grand Prix de la Londe, France
1st Grand Prix Bonville, France
1st Grand Prix de Geneve, Switzerland

1998
1st  British National Championships, Team Time Trial
1st Manx International Time Trial
1st Premier Calendar, Grand Prix of Essex
1st Premier Calendar, Europa 2-day
1st Stage 1, Europa 2-day
1st Stage 2, Europa 2-day
1st Mersey Invitation Time Trial
2nd British National Time Trial Championships – 25-mile
8th Prutour, Prydain

1999
1st  British National Time Trial Championships
1st  British National Time Trial Championships – 25-mile
1st  British National Championships, Team Time Trial
1st Manx International Time Trial
1st Premier Calendar, Europa 2-day
2nd Stage 1, Bishop's Waltham-Stephen's Castle, Premier Calendar, Europa 2-day
2nd Stage 2, Bishop's Waltham, Premier Calendar, Europa 2-day

2000
1st  British National Time Trial Championships
1st Grand Prix Claude Criquielion, Belgium
1st Internationale Wielertrofee Jong Maar Moedig
1st Premier Calendar, Europa 2-day
1st Stage 2, Bishop's Waltham, Premier Calendar, Europa 2-day
1st Premier Calendar, Lincoln Grand Prix
1st Premier Calendar, Silver Spoon Chase
1st Premier Calendar, Oleum Grand Prix
3rd UCI World Cup, Italy
3rd British National Time Trial Championships – 25-mile
45th 49th Olympia Tour, Netherlands
1st Stage 7, Bedum, 49th Olympia Tour
1st Stage 8, Bedum-Almere, 49th Olympia Tour
2nd Stage 1, Tilburg, 49th Olympia Tour

2001
1st  British National Circuit Race Championships
1st Circuit des Mines, France
1st Stage 5, Sainte Marie aux Chenes-Metz, Circuit des Mines
2nd Stage 1, Briey-Plan-D'Eau, Circuit des Mines
2nd Stage 4, Rosselange-Guenange, Circuit des Mines
3rd Stage 6, Trieux-Chateau de Malbrouck, Circuit des Mines
1st Grand Prix Ploogestraat, Belgium
1st Premier Calendar, Lancaster Grand Prix
3rd British National Time Trial Championships
23rd Cinturón Ciclista Internacional a Mallorca
1st Stage 3, Santa Margarita, Cinturón Ciclista Internacional a Mallorca
2nd Stage 1, Laya de Palma-El Arenal, Cinturón Ciclista Internacional a Mallorca

2002
1st Tour de la Manche, France
2nd FBD Milk Rás, Ireland
1st Sprint Competition, FBD Milk Rás
1st Stage 1, FBD Milk Rás, Dublin – Ballinamore
2nd Stage 4, FBD Milk Rás, Killorglin – Castletownbere
2nd Stage 5, FBD Milk Rás, Castletownbere – Midleton
1st Stage 6, FBD Milk Rás, Dungarvan – Arklow
1st Stage 7, FBD Milk Rás, Arklow – Baltinglass
1st Stage 8, FBD Milk Rás, Phoenix Park Circuit Race
1st Stage 1, Beroun-Beroun, Gweriniaeth Tsiec
1st Stage 4, Joeuf – Metz, Circuit des Mines, France
3rd British National Time Trial Championships – 25-mile

2003
1st FBD Milk Rás, Ireland
Stage 5, FBD Milk Rás, Letterkenny – Buncrana

2004
3rd Colne Grand Prix

2005
1st  British National Time Trial Championships
1st FBD Insurance Ras, Ireland
3rd, Sprint Competition, FBD Insurance Ras
2nd Clitheroe Town Centre Grand Prix

2006
1st Stage race, Tour of the South
1st 1 Stage, Tour of the South
2nd British National Time Trial Championships – 25-mile

2007
1st Premier Calendar Series
1st Premier Calendar, Bikeline 2-day, Hope
1st Stage 1, Premier Calendar, Bikeline 2-day
1st Premier Calendar, Ryedale Grand Prix
2nd Premier Calendar, 38th Girvan 3-day
1st Stage 1, 38th Girvan 3-day
3rd Stage 2, 38th Girvan 3-day
3rd Stage 3, 38th Girvan 3-day
4th Stage 4, 38th Girvan 3-day
2nd Premier Calendar, Beaumont Trophy
3rd Premier Calendar, Blackpool Grand Prix
Premier Calendar, Grand Prix of Wales
5th Premier Calendar, Tour of Pendle

2008
 1st Stage 3, FBD Insurance Rás, Claremorris – Lisdoonvarna
 1st Clayton Velo Spring Classic
4th Lincoln Grand Prix
4th Richmond Grand Prix

2009
1st Rochdale Grand Prix Circuit Race
3rd Newcastle Leazes Criterium
 4th Lincoln Grand Prix

2010
 1st Lincoln GP
 1st Tour Doon Hame
 1st Beaumont Trophy
 1st Premier Calendar Series
 3rd Clayton Velo Spring Classic
 4th East Yorkshire Classic
 5th York Cycling City Centre Race

References

External links
 

1973 births
Living people
English male cyclists
Commonwealth Games gold medallists for England
Commonwealth Games silver medallists for England
Commonwealth Games bronze medallists for England
Cyclists at the 1994 Commonwealth Games
Cyclists at the 1998 Commonwealth Games
Cyclists at the 2002 Commonwealth Games
Cyclists at the 2006 Commonwealth Games
Olympic cyclists of Great Britain
Olympic silver medallists for Great Britain
Olympic bronze medallists for Great Britain
Cyclists at the 1996 Summer Olympics
Cyclists at the 2000 Summer Olympics
Cyclists at the 2004 Summer Olympics
Cyclists at the 2008 Summer Olympics
Alumni of Teesside University
Sportspeople from Middlesbrough
Olympic medalists in cycling
UCI Track Cycling World Champions (men)
English cycling coaches
Medalists at the 2008 Summer Olympics
University of Michigan alumni
Cyclists from Yorkshire
Medalists at the 2004 Summer Olympics
Medalists at the 2000 Summer Olympics
Commonwealth Games medallists in cycling
English track cyclists
Rás Tailteann winners
Medallists at the 1994 Commonwealth Games
Medallists at the 2002 Commonwealth Games
Medallists at the 2006 Commonwealth Games